The attentive carplet or silver carplet (Amblypharyngodon melettinus) is a species of carplet in the family Cyprinidae. It is found in freshwater streams, ponds and rivers of India and Sri Lanka.

Etymology
The generic name comes from Greek, "" means "darkness" and Greek name "" for "pharynx" with "" means "teeth".

References

Amblypharyngodon
Freshwater fish of India
Freshwater fish of Sri Lanka
Fish described in 1844
Taxa named by Achille Valenciennes